Freedom of the press in China refers to the journalism standards and its freedom and censorship exercised by the government of China. The Constitution of the People's Republic of China guarantees "freedom of speech [and] of the press" which the government in practice routinely violates with total impunity, according to Reporters Without Borders.

Authorities often label independent or investigative coverage as "fake news". Since Xi Jinping became the general secretary of the Chinese Communist Party (CCP) in 2012, various commentators, protesters, feminists, lawyers, journalists, and activists have been arrested, detained, jailed, and threatened for attempting to exercise press freedom.

Background 
The country's constitution prohibits media workers, including internet users from publishing, writing, circulating or otherwise posting fake news, misinformation, disinformation and propaganda related to various subjects such as national security, terrorism, ethnic hatred, violence, and obscenity. However, most private journalists are restricted from sharing certain views and opinions with the general public. 

China introduced Article 35 of the constitution of China that provides its citizens right to observe "press freedom" in a free environment, however Article 51 prohibits such activities for the national interest which limits press freedom in the country. Chinese mass media such as radio and television broadcast news under Article 25, which limits their ability to broadcast plays, news, and other forms of information in free journalism standards, which according to the Regulation on the Administration of Publishing prevent transmitting of such content that poses risk to sovereignty and public interest.

A book titled 'Freedom of the Press in China: A Conceptual History, 1831-1949 by Yi Guo has also been published in August 2020 by Amsterdam University Press, consisting of a detailed analysis of press freedom of China from 1831 to 1949.

Freedom of the Press in China was greatest during the early period (1966-1968) of the Cultural Revolution. During this period, several Red Guard organizations also operated independent printing presses to publish newspapers, articles, speeches, and big-character posters.

Media organizations and its workers, explicitly foreign media working within the country "must" obtain a license before they engage in journalism compiled with standards which are regulated by the foreign affairs authority. Foreign media has limited access or freedom to attend press conferences of the National People's Congress, however the law of China allows state-owned media with "free press" such as raising questions or concerns in the press conference. Domestically, sanctioned journalists must study Xi Jinping thought through the “Study Xi, Strengthen the Country propaganda application” in order for them to renew their press credentials.

Global rank 

The global rank of China declined to 177 out of 180 since the Chinese Communist Party came into power. China has been one of the countries with nominal freedom of press regulations. Reporters Without Borders, a non-government organisation dedicated to safeguarding the right to information published an annual report, the Press Freedom Index, indicating that the Chinese Communist Party, the ruling party, is exercising self and direct-censorship on the press.

Censorship 

According to Reporters Without Borders, the role of the media in China is to impart state propaganda. Chinese authorities, accounting to the Committee to Protect Journalists are often argued to have been involved in press suppression. It is often referred to as one of the frontline-countries where freedom of mass communication and its associated people such as journalists persistently experience troubles. China often blocks news websites, social media platforms and other services such as Facebook, Gmail, Google, Instagram, and Pinterest, and has limited their access to the general public. The Great Firewall has blocked most foreign news websites such as Voice of America, VOA Chinese, the BBC, The New York Times and Bloomberg News. In 2017, Chinese authorities also removed about "300 politically sensitive articles" from the Cambridge University Press, however this article removal was later contested online on Change.org. In 2019, some scholars and writers deleted their posts or permanently deleted their feeds after authorities asked them to do so. Some writers were warned for retweeting or liking posts.

Up to 2012 when Hu Jintao was the Communist Party's leader, the press was free to share their views online, however, Xi Jinping is arguably using technology as a propaganda tool and often blocks sensitive information through the Great Firewall. The authorities often raid pro-democracy activists and media owners in an attempt to suppress the press. In 2019, China blocked all available versions of Wikipedia in the country without any notice to Wikimedia Foundation.

Chinese journalists are often detained for alleged negative coverage. In 2016, more than twenty journalists, including commentator Jia Jia were arrested after an open letter was published calling on Chinese leader Xi Jinping to resign. According to Reporters without Borders, independent journalists and bloggers are often surveilled, harassed, detained, and in some cases tortured.  A report published by the Committee to Protect Journalists in 2016 asserted an estimated 49 journalists are serving prison terms, indicating that China is a "prolific jailer of media workers".

See also 
 Human rights in China

Books

References

Further reading 
 
 

China
Human rights abuses in China
Political controversies in China
Political repression in China
Mass media in China